Death Traps: The Survival of an American Armored Division in World War II is a 1998 memoir by Belton Y. Cooper. The book relates Cooper's experiences during World War II and puts forth an argument against the US Army's use of the M4 Sherman tank during the war.

Belton Y. Cooper
Belton Youngblood Cooper (October 4, 1917 - May 26, 2007) served in the Reserve Officers' Training Corps (ROTC) in the artillery branch while attending college at the Virginia Military Institute. After transferring to the University of Michigan to study marine architecture and marine engineering, he attempted to transfer to the ROTC Naval branch, but having already received his commission, as he phrased it, began his "enlightenment about the government's bureaucratic machinations," and was summarily ordered by the War Department to report for service in the US Army with the 3rd Armored Division in June 1941.

Cooper served with the 3rd Armored Division during World War II, and saw action from the Invasion of Normandy in 1944 through the Allied invasion of Germany in 1945. He was tasked with the "recovery, repair, and maintenance" of US tanks during the war. He refers to this as "running the gauntlet", due to the tendency of Allied armored forces to bypass some German elements in their advance, leaving pockets of enemy forces between the quickly advancing armor and the trailing infantry units.

The Sherman and Pershing tanks
Cooper argues against the ultimate decision by the US Army, supposedly (according to Cooper with no evidence given) influenced by General George S. Patton, to favor the smaller M4 Sherman medium tank over the heavier M26 Pershing, which Cooper describes as being "in every way far superior". Cooper cites in part, the large number of casualties the comparatively lightly armored Sherman suffered against the superior German tanks:

The 3rd Armored Division entered combat in Normandy with 232 M4 Sherman tanks. During the European Campaign, the Division had some 648 Shermans completely destroyed in combat and we had another 700 knocked out, repaired, and put back into operation. This was a loss rate of 580 percent.

Cooper argues that, when compared to the Sherman, the Pershing would have been better armed, better armored, more reliable, and more mobile. He blames the Army's preference for the Sherman, on the notion that building tanks such as the more expensive Pershing was unnecessary, because "tanks were not meant to fight other tanks," as was dictated by the Armored Force Doctrine of the time, and because Patton believed the lighter and more fuel efficient M4 would be more agile in bypassing enemy lines and attacking in the rear.

Reception

Death Traps has received mixed reviews since its release; the way Cooper described his experiences during the war has been praised, but the book also has received significant criticism for Cooper's attempts to pass judgment on events he never directly experienced (for example, his claims about Patton and the Pershing), as well as the number of completely unfounded statements and historical inaccuracies it contains.

Publishers Weekly wrote of Death Traps in 1998 that, "Without a doubt, this is one of the finest WWII memoirs ever written by an American junior officer," and predicted it would become "required reading for anyone interested in armored warfare." In the foreword to the book, Stephen E. Ambrose wrote, "Cooper saw more of the war than most junior officers, and he writes about it better than almost anyone." The Library Journal wrote: "[Readers] will be left with an indelible impression of the importance of the support troops and how dependent combat forces were on them.”

The website Tank and AFV News as well as historian Robert Forczyk were critical of the book and the reliance it has garnered online and in media coverage, writing:

As a memoir, it is meandering and repetitive, far too often wandering away from the author's personal experiences into the realm of speculation.  As a history it is lacking, containing no end notes, foot notes or bibliography.  And finally, as an indictment of the M4 Sherman tank, the book is filled with so many factual errors and outright falsehoods, it cannot be taken seriously on this count either.

Writing in the Air and Space Power Journal US Air Force Major Gary Pounder described the book as "well worth reading" but "not without its faults," citing a dearth of maps and illustrations, and describing Cooper as being at times a "plodding writer" with a tendency to rehash statistics that have already been covered in previous chapters.

Media
 Death Traps was one of the inspirations behind director David Ayer's 2014 film Fury.
 The book was the basis for a portion of an episode of the network Historys show Modern Marvels entitled Engineering Disasters, which focused on the Sherman tank.

See also
 Bibliography of World War II
 Tanks in World War II

Notes

References

External links
 

1998 non-fiction books
Non-fiction books about war
History books about World War II